New Hall Manor is a medieval manor house, now used as a hotel, in Sutton Coldfield, West Midlands, England.

It is claimed to be one of the oldest inhabited moated houses in Britain, dating from the 13th century when the Earl of Warwick built a hunting lodge on the site. The first reference to the site as a manor is from 1435 when by the homage in a court baron at Sutton after Sir Richard Stanhope's death, when he held it of the Earl of Warwick. The core of the present building, including the great hall, dates from the 16th century when the Gibbons family (relatives of Bishop Vesey) were in residence. Thomas Gibbons is said to have bought New Hall in 1552. Later owners included the Sacheverells, who received it from Thomas and Edward Giddons, and the Chadwicks, who were bequeathed it from George Sacheverell. In 1739, the Sacheverells mortgaged the New Hall estate to Francis Horton of Wolverhampton.

The buildings served briefly as a school from 1885; Lt. Col. Wilkinson restored the Hall to residential use in 1903. In 1923 it was acquired by Alfred Owen  of Rubery Owen and remained the Owen family home until the 1970s. It was converted to a hotel in 1988 by Ian Hannah and Ken Arkley, of Thistle Hotels. It is now owned and operated by Hand Picked Hotels.

The house gives its name to Sutton New Hall ward, New Hall Valley and the New Hall Valley Country Park therein, and also the New Hall Estate and New Hall Manor Estate, which was constructed on New Hall Farm, both residential developments.

Plants Brook used to drive New Hall Mill before being channelled away from the mill.

The building is Grade I listed, with other Grade II structures.

Bon Jovi's music video for "I'll Sleep When I'm Dead" was filmed at New Hall Manor in 1993.

The exteriors of the building were additionally briefly used during the third season of TV show Killing Eve in 2020

References

External links
Hotel official website
Hand Picked Hotels website
British History - The borough of Sutton Coldfield

Houses in Birmingham, West Midlands
Hotels in Birmingham, West Midlands
Grade I listed buildings in the West Midlands (county)
Grade I listed houses
Sutton Coldfield
Grade I listed buildings in Birmingham